Mohammad Moslemipour (born May 25, 1997) is an Iranian footballer who plays for Tractor as a defender.

Club career

Tractor S.C.
Moslemipour joined Tractor in summer 2017.

Club career statistics

References

External links 

 

1997 births
Living people
Association football fullbacks
Footballers at the 2018 Asian Games
Iranian footballers
Asian Games competitors for Iran
Tractor S.C. players